Briton Ferry Llansawel A.F.C. is a football club based in Briton Ferry in Wales, currently playing in the Cymru South. The club was formed in 2009 after the merger between Briton Ferry Athletic and Llansawel .

The club's crest uses the colours green, red and yellow, which represent the colours of the two merged teams. For 2009–10 the home colours were the traditional Briton Ferry quartered red and green shirt, green shorts and red socks. The away colours were the traditional Llansawel yellow shirt, black shorts and hooped yellow and black socks.

History 
During September 2008 representatives of Briton Ferry Athletic and Llansawel entered into discussion about the possibility of merging the two clubs. After a lengthy period of consideration, it was announced  on 28 April 2009 that the two clubs had merged to form Briton Ferry Llansawel.

They were to  play their first season in Welsh Football League Third Division, replacing Briton Ferry Athletic. South Gower replaced Llansawel after they applied for membership to the league.

Current squad
As of 30 October 2019.

Staff
 Manager: Carl Shaw 
 Assistant Manager: Raymond Pennock
 Coach: Mark Napierella
Goalkeeper Coach: Leigh David
Sports Therapist: Sara Grey

References 

Sport in Neath Port Talbot
Football clubs in Wales
Association football clubs established in 2009
2009 establishments in Wales
Briton Ferry
Welsh Football League clubs
Cymru South clubs